Vladislav Vladimirovich Tyurin (born 18 April 2000) is a Russian football player. He plays for FC Tyumen on loan from PFC Krylia Sovetov Samara.

Club career
He made his debut in the Russian Premier League for PFC Krylia Sovetov Samara on 7 July 2020 in a game against FC Arsenal Tula, replacing Anton Zinkovsky in the 84th minute.

On 11 July 2021, he joined FC Tyumen on loan.

References

External links
 
 
 

2000 births
Sportspeople from Saratov
Living people
Russian footballers
Association football midfielders
FC Arsenal Tula players
PFC Krylia Sovetov Samara players
FC Tyumen players
Russian Premier League players
Russian First League players
Russian Second League players